Taro Tsujimoto is the name of a fictitious ice hockey player who was "selected" by the National Hockey League's Buffalo Sabres as the 183rd overall pick in the 11th round of the 1974 NHL amateur draft. The hoax was created in protest of how the NHL's draft was carried out at the time: deliberately slowly via telephone so that the rival World Hockey Association would not know who was being selected. The NHL did not realize that no player with this name existed until much later, and in response changed Buffalo's selection to "invalid claim" in their official records.

History
The Sabres' general manager at the time, Punch Imlach, was reportedly fed up with the slow drafting process, conducted via telephone, which was intended to keep draft picks secret from the rival World Hockey Association. During the 1974 draft, Imlach, who in the earlier rounds had already drafted several players that would go on to great success with the team (Derek Smith in the previous round and All-Stars Lee Fogolin and Danny Gare in the first two rounds), decided to have some fun at the expense of the league and Clarence Campbell, the NHL president for the previous 28 years. He enlisted PR Director Paul Wieland to create a fictional player.

Wieland wanted the player to be of Asian descent and he knew instantly what the last name would be. As a college student driving Route 16 from Buffalo to St. Bonaventure, Wieland would regularly pass the Tsujimoto store and that name just stuck in his head. In 2013, hockey blogger Ben Tsujimoto revealed that Imlach eventually called his grandfather – Joshua Tsujimoto, a local Japanese truck farmer and Asian food store owner – and a Sabres staffer asked for permission to use his family name without revealing the club's true intent, as well as asking what were "popular" first names in Japanese. Imlach chose to select star center Taro Tsujimoto of the fictional Tokyo Katanas of the Japan Ice Hockey League, "Katanas" being an approximation for "Sabres" in the Japanese language, both referring to types of swords. The JIHL, although it was a real entity, had no team representing Tokyo at the time; Kokudo would not relocate to the city until 1984, whereupon it became the Seibu Prince Rabbits. The league was replaced by the current Asia League Ice Hockey in 2004. Incidentally, 32 years later, in 2006, Kokudo would provide the first real Japanese player to play in the NHL, Yutaka Fukufuji. The NHL made the pick official, and so it was reported by media outlets, including The Hockey News.

Tsujimoto's pick came at a time when the NHL was only beginning to expand its reach for players outside Canada and the United States; Scandinavian players were beginning to be drafted into the league at around the same time. Although the players of the Soviet Union, at the time an international powerhouse, were effectively off-limits, it would have not been out of the ordinary for NHL franchises to scout for new hockey talent in unusual places, which is part of the reason there were no major objections to the legitimacy of Imlach's draft pick.

Imlach did not acknowledge the fake draft pick until just before the start of training camp that year; the team even set up a stall for Tsujimoto and listed him on their training camp roster. The NHL eventually changed the pick to "invalid claim" for its official record-keeping purposes. Campbell did not find the hoax draft pick nearly as funny as Imlach, but this was after Tsujimoto's name had appeared in several NHL publications. Tsujimoto is still listed as a fictitious entry among Sabres' draft picks in the Sabres media guide. Hockey-Reference.com lists the Sabres as having no 11th-round pick in 1974 on their list of Sabres draft picks, and skips over the 183rd pick on their lists of 1974 selections.

Among the players selected after Tsujimoto were Dave Lumley, who played nine years in the NHL and won two Stanley Cups with the Edmonton Oilers, and Stefan Persson, who was selected in the 14th round by the New York Islanders and played for all four of their Cup-winning teams. (Lumley and Persson even faced each other in the 1983 Stanley Cup Finals.) It was not until 1992 that an actual Japanese player was drafted in the NHL, when the Montreal Canadiens selected Hiroyuki Miura.

Legacy
Tsujimoto quickly became an inside joke for Sabres' fans and staffers.  For years after the pick, fans would chant "We Want Taro" when games at the Buffalo Memorial Auditorium became one-sided. In addition, for many years, banners would be hung from the balcony rail stating "Taro Says..." followed by a witty comment against an opponent or player for the opponent.

In the summer of 2011, trading card company Panini America added Tsujimoto to its 2010–11 Score Rookies & Traded box set. The card used a picture of an unidentified Asian man playing hockey for a team wearing similar blue-and-gold colors to the Sabres.

As of 2015, Andrew Kulyk, sportswriter for Buffalo-area alternative weekly Artvoice, includes short musings on the local sports scene under the heading "Taro Sez" in most of his columns.

The video game Franchise Hockey Manager  series contains Taro in its database, and thus he exists as a real player in the game.

Two books have been published on Tsujimoto. In 2016, Mark Hinrich released The Legend of Taro Tsujimoto: The Unauthorized, Fictional Biography, a biography about his legend. In 2019, Wieland released Taro Lives! about Tsujimoto's creation. Fans can purchase Sabres team jerseys with the name Tsujimoto and the number 74.

See also
 Sidd Finch, a fictitious baseball player created as an April Fools' Day prank in 1985

Notes

External links
 Buffalo Sabres' 1974 11th round draft pick in hockeydraftcentral.com

Buffalo Sabres draft picks
1974–75 NHL season
Nonexistent people used in hoaxes
In-jokes
Fictional ice hockey players
Fictional Japanese people
Living people
Year of birth missing (living people)